Bufoides meghalayanus is a species of toad in the family Bufonidae, the true toads. It is also known as the Mawblang toad, rock toad, or Khasi Hills toad. It is endemic to northeastern India where it is known from Meghalaya and Mizoram. However, records from Mizoram may represent an undescribed species, and this species might have a very restricted range in the Khasi Hills near Cherrapunji.

Bufoides meghalayanus occur in montane forests dominated by screw pines Pandanus furcatus. Breeding takes place in leaf axils of screw pines and in boulder pot-holes.

This species is threatened by rock quarrying and use of forest resources (logging and extraction of firewood and timber). The populations representing the undescribed form occur in Ngengpui Wildlife Sanctuary and Dampa Tiger Reserve.

References

meghalayanus
Frogs of India
Endemic fauna of India
Amphibians described in 1971